Flying Colors is the debut studio album by the American supergroup Flying Colors, released on 26 March 2012. It debuted at No. 9 on Billboard's Hard Rock chart, and No. 11 on the BBC's Rock Album charts. The album art is based on the artwork Blown Away by artist and sculptor Jim Bond, as photographed by John Coombes.

Background and writing
The band composed and recorded the album in just nine days in early 2011, during a short and intense session. Dave LaRue recalls, “It was quite an experience – the band moved at a fast pace, ideas flying around the room at all times. Sections of tunes were arranged, then re-arranged, ideas were tried every which way until we made them work, or, in some cases, discarded them altogether. Just keeping track of everything was a challenge!”  McPherson adds, “This record is filled with trial and triumph. Raw and delicate songs alike amidst the swirling and daring orchestration of Steve, Neal, Mike and Dave. It’s been such an inspiring challenge melding folk, prog, pop, and metal all into one big recording.” In March of 2011, a shorter second session was held to record final vocals and let Collins work out the final arrangement of the songs.

True Colors
In 2017, the band released True Colors, the raw "unmastered" version direct from the mixing desk of Michael Brauer. The band reports this version to have "more detail, dynamics, and depth" as the original version was "taken prisoner in the loudness wars."

Track listing

Personnel
Flying Colors
 Steve Morse – lead and rhythm guitar
 Casey McPherson – Lead vocals, co-lead vocals (1, 3, 7, 10, 11)
 Neal Morse – keyboards, backing vocals, co-lead vocals (1, 3, 7, 11)
 Dave LaRue – bass guitar
 Mike Portnoy – drums, percussion, co-lead vocals on "Fool In My Heart"
Production
 Bill Evans – executive producer, production engineer, cover art, arrangement
 Peter Collins – producer
 Jerry Guidroz - recording engineer, studio engineer
 Michael Brauer - mix engineer
 Howie Weinberg - mastering engineer
 Roy Koch - layout

References

2012 debut albums
Albums produced by Peter Collins (record producer)
Flying Colors (band) albums